Viking ship replicas are one of the more common types of ship replica. Viking, the very first Viking ship replica,  was built by the Rødsverven shipyard in Sandefjord, Norway.  In 1893 it sailed across the Atlantic Ocean to Chicago in the United States for the World's Columbian Exposition. Formerly located in Lincoln Park, Chicago, Illinois, the Viking is  currently undergoing conservation in Geneva, Illinois, United States.

There are a considerable number of modern reconstructions of Viking Age ships in service around Northern Europe and North America. The Viking Ship Museum in Roskilde, Denmark, has been particularly prolific in building accurate reconstructions of archaeological finds in its collection.

Europe

Denmark 
 Freja Byrding - Hejlsminde, Denmark (5-8 persons, Skuldelev ships 3)
 Havhingsten fra Glendalough ("Sea Stallion from Glendalough") - Roskilde, Denmark, 2004  (60-100 persons, Skuldelev ships 2)
 Heidrun - Skælskør
 Helge Ask - Roskilde, 1991 (30 persons, Skuldelev ships 5)
 Imme Aros - Århus, 1969 (30 persons, Ellingå ship of AD 1163, renamed Imme Struer 2003)
 Imme Gram - Tønder, 1963 (32 persons, Ladby ship, lost 2009)
 Imme Sejr - Tønder, 2013 (38 persons, Ladby ship)
 Kraka - Roskilde, 1971 (40 ft, 7-15 persons)
 Kraka Fyr - Roskilde, 1987 (5-15 persons, Skuldelev ships 6)
 Ladbydragen - Vikingemuseet Ladby, Kerteminde, 2016 (32 oars, Ladby ship)
 Lindheim Sunds - Ollerup, 1977 (30 persons, Skuldelev ships 5)
 Nidhug - Lundby Strand, 1998 (3-28 persons)
 Ottar - Roskilde, 2000 (6-8 persons, Skuldelev ships 1)
 Randaros  - Randers (39 ft)
 Roar Ege - Roskilde, 1985 (5-8 persons, Skuldelev ships 3)
 Røskva - Skælskør
 Saga Siglar - Roskilde, 1983 (6-8 persons, Skuldelev ships 1, sank off the Catalan coast in 1992)
 Sebbe Als - Augustenborg, Denmark, 1969 (30 persons, Skuldelev ships 5) 
 Sif Ege - Frederikssund, 1990 (5-8 persons Skuldelev ships 3)

Estonia 
 Aimar - Käsmu, Estonia, built 2009-2010, 1/2 size replica of Gokstad ship, LOA 10m, Beam 2m, 8 oars
 Thule and Neyve - Nõva, Läänemaa, Estonia, built 2010-2011, 1/4 replica of Gokstad ship, LOA 6,7m Beam 1,7m and 4 oars
 Äge  - Kiruvere, Estonia, LOA=11.6m, B=2,8m, 12 oars, built 2011-2012, replica of Foteviken 1(Fotevikens Museum) 
Hüljes - Karja, Estonia, built 2017-2018, replica of the smallest boat from Gokstad find - faering. LOA 6,5m Beam 1,6m, 4 oars

France 
 Dreknor - Cherbourg, Normandy, France
 Gungnir - Puiselet-Saint-Pierre-lès-Nemours

Iceland 
 Íslendingur - Iceland (22.5 m, 9 persons) housed at the Viking World Museum
 Vésteinn - Iceland (LOA 12m, Beam 2,7m, 14 oars, 1/2 Gokstad ship replica built 2008 in Thingeyri, Westfjords)

Norway 
 Draken Harald Hårfagre ("Dragon Harald Fairhair") - Haugesund, 2012 (100 persons)
 Dronningen - Bjørkedalen, 1987 (replica of Oseberg ship)
 Gaia ship - Sandefjord

Sweden 
 Ormen Friske ("Healthy Serpent") - Trosa, 1949 (12-70 persons, Gokstad ship, lost 1950)
 Krampmacken - Gotland, 1980 (8 meters, replica of the Bulverket ship)
 Vidfamne - Gothenburg, 1994 (16 metres, replica of the Äskekärr ship)

UK 
 Hugin - located at Pegwell Bay in Ramsgate, Kent. Built Denmark 1949 as replica of Gokstad ship.
 Odin's Raven -  2/3 scale replica of the Gokstad ship, built in Norway, sailed across the North Sea and now kept in the museum at the House of Manannan in Peel, Isle of Man
 Ratatosk - Built in Norway now in the United Kingdom (20 ft, 6 persons, 1/4 Scale replica of the Gokstad ship)

Americas

Canada 
 Munin - Vancouver, British Columbia (40 ft, 7-15 persons)
 Viking Saga - Newfoundland

United States 
 Skelmir - San Antonio, Texas (22 ft, 8 persons)
 Viking - Built in the Rødsverven shipyard in Sandefjord, Norway. Currently located and undergoing conservation in Geneva, Illinois.
 Leif Erikson (42 ft, 4 persons) - sailed across the Atlantic from Bergen, Norway in 1926, in Leif Erikson Park, Duluth, Minnesota.
 Redwolf - San Antonio (40 ft, 17 persons - under construction)
 Fyrdraca - Missouri (32 ft, 18 persons - retired from service with the Longship Company 2003)
 Sae Hrafn - Maryland (40 ft, 18 persons)
 Gyrfalcon - Maryland (20 ft, 5 persons)
 Skogar Þrostur (formerly called the Blackbird) - Connecticut (22 ft, 3 persons).  She was built in Ohio by the group 'Viking Age Vessels' and is now owned by Vinland Longships in Connecticut.
 Yrsa - Missouri (27 ft 8 persons)
 Wulfwaig - Oklahoma City (21 ft, 5 persons)
 Hjemkomst - Moorhead, Minnesota. Building began in 1974 and sailed from Duluth, MN to Bergen, Norway in 1982 with a crew of 12. Now housed at the Hjemkomst Center in Moorhead, Minnesota
 Norseman - Kalmar Nyckel Shipyard, Wilmington, DE. (LOA: 40'; LWL: 26'; Beam: 9')

See also

Skuldelev ships
Gokstad ship
Fotevikens Museum
Oseberg ship

References

External links

 Sea Stallion, Roskilde, Denmark
 Viking Ship Museum Boat Collection, Roskilde, Denmark
 Sif Ege, Frederikssund, Denmark
 The Skelmir, San Antonio
 Dreknor Project
 Gaia, the Gokstad Ship copy
 Munin, a Gokstad replica in Vancouver, B.C.
 Yrsa, Viking Raider
 Sebbe Als, Augustenborg, Denmark - page mainly in Danish
 The Longship Company, owners of the Sea Hrafn (Sea Raven) and the Gryfalcon
 Robert Asp Replica - 'Hjemkomst'   Moorhead, MN
 New Oseberg Ship Foundation
 Skogar Þrostur based in Connecticut.
 The Ansteorran Longship Project based in Texas.
 The Hjemkomst Viking Ship based in Minnesota.